Abdulelah Ali Awadh Al-Amri (born 15 January 1997) is a Saudi Arabian professional footballer who plays as a centre back for Pro League club Al-Nassr and the Saudi Arabia national team.

Club career
Al-Amri progressed through Al-Nassr's youth system. He signed his first professional contract with the club on 27 November 2017. On 14 December 2017, Al-Amri made his debut in a 1–1 draw with Al-Faisaly. On 27 May 2018, Al-Amri was loaned to Al-Wehda for the 2018–19 season.

Following his return from loan, Al-Amri was mainly used as a fourth-choice center-back. However, during the second half of the 2019–20 season, Al-Amri managed to establish himself as a starter. He made 15 appearances throughout all competitions. He scored his first goal for the club on 22 February 2020 in the 2–0 win against Al-Hazem. On 27 January 2021, Al-Amri renewed his contract with Al-Nassr until the end of the 2023–24 season.

International career
Al-Amri has represented Saudi Arabia at under-20 level and under-23 level. Al-Amri captained the Saudi Arabia under-20 side at the 2017 U-20 World Cup. 

Al-Amri made his debut for the Saudi Arabia national team at the 2019 AFC Asian Cup.

On 6 July 2021, Al-Amri was named in the squad for the 2020 Olympics.

On 11 November 2022, Al-Amri was named in the squad for the 2022 FIFA World Cup.

Career statistics

Club

International
Statistics accurate as of match played 30 November 2022.

International goals
Scores and results list Saudi Arabia's goal tally first.

Honours
Al-Nassr
 Saudi Super Cup: 2019, 2020

Individual
 Saudi Professional League Young Player of the Month: November 2020, March 2021

References

External links
 

1997 births
Living people
People from Taif
Saudi Arabian footballers
Association football defenders
Saudi Professional League players
Wej SC players
Al Nassr FC players
Al-Wehda Club (Mecca) players
Saudi Arabia international footballers
Saudi Arabia youth international footballers
Footballers at the 2018 Asian Games
2019 AFC Asian Cup players
Asian Games competitors for Saudi Arabia
Olympic footballers of Saudi Arabia
Footballers at the 2020 Summer Olympics
20th-century Saudi Arabian people
21st-century Saudi Arabian people
2022 FIFA World Cup players